Royal Air Force Brackla or more simply RAF Brackla is a former Royal Air Force satellite station located in Scotland.

History

The following units were here at some point:
 Relief landing ground of No. 2 Air Gunners School RAF (1944-45)
 Satellite of No. 2 Central Flying School RAF (November 1941 - January 1942)
 Relief Landing Ground of No. 14 (Pilots) Advanced Flying Unit RAF (June - September 1944)
 Satellite of No. 19 Operational Training Unit RAF (January 1942 - April 1944)
 Relief Landing Ground of No. 19 (Pilots) Advanced Flying Unit RAF (October 1942 - June 1943 & December 1943 - February 1944)
 Satellite of No. 45 Maintenance Unit RAF (February 1944 - September 1947)
 Air Crew Allocation Centre

Current use

The site is now used as farmland.

References

Citations

Bibliography

Brackla
Royal Air Force stations of World War II in the United Kingdom
Military airbases established in 1941